Mickey Mouse is a Walt Disney animated character. He was created to increase popularity for Disney’s film company. He is a big reason for their success over the years.

Mickey Mouse may also refer to:

Film and television
 Mickey Mouse (film series), 1928–1953
 Mickey Mouse (TV series), 2013–2019

Comics
 Mickey Mouse (comic strip), 1930–1976
 Mickey Mouse (comic book) or Mickey Mouse and Friends, a comic book series, 1941–2011
 Walt Disney's Mickey Mouse, a comic book series, 2011–present

Other uses
 Mickey Mouse universe, a fictional shared universe which is the setting for stories involving Disney cartoon characters Mickey Mouse etc.
 Mickey Mouse degrees, university degree courses regarded as worthless or irrelevant
 Mickey Mouse connector, an IEC 60320 standard specifying the size and shape of power couplers

See also
 Mickey Mouse Adventures, a comic book series, 1990–1991, 2004–2006
 Lego Mickey Mouse, a Disney-licensed Lego toy line, 2000-2002
 Mickey Mouse Weekly, a Disney-licensed British comic, 1936-1957
 Mickey Mouse in Vietnam, a 1970 unlicensed film
 Mickey Mouse Works, a TV series, 1999–2000
 Mickey Mouse Clubhouse, a TV series, 2006–2016
 List of Mickey Mouse films and appearances
 Mickey's Mouse Tracks, a TV series, 1992-1995
 Topolino, eponymous Italian language Disney-licensed comic book series, 1932-present
 Mickey Mousing, a film technique that syncs the accompanying music with the actions on screen
 Minnie Mouse

Mickey Mouse